Krishanti Kumaraswamy, also spelled Krishanthi Kumaraswamy, was a Tamil woman in Sri Lanka who was raped and murdered on 7 September 1996 by 6 Sri Lankan Army soldiers; the effort to bring her assailants to justice became a cause célèbre as a part of the protest against atrocities committed by the Sri Lankan Army during the Sri Lanka civil war.

Background
Krishanti Kumaraswamy was student of Chundikuli Girls High School doing her GCE Advanced Levelhaving earlier passed the Ordinary Level exam with seven distinctions Her mother Rasamma was the principal of Kaithady Maha Vithyalayam.Her father had died in 1984.Her elder sister Prashanthi was studying in Colombo. Pranavan her younger brother was student of St.Johns College Jaffna had given his G.C.E (O/L) exams.Her neighbor Kirupakaran had got married just 6 months ago.Her family lived in Kaithady.

Incident
On September 7, 1996 Krishanti Kumaraswamy went missing on her way home after sitting her GCE Advanced Level  chemistry examination at Chundikuli Girls High School. She was last seen alive at 11:30 am at Kaithady Army checkpoint in Jaffna.She had been detained while cycling back home which passerby had seen and they informed her mother. She used to cross the checkpoint daily  while returning from school  .

Her mother Rassammah, brother Pranavan (age 16), and family friend Kirupakaran (age 35) became concerned and went in search of Krishanti. They were also murdered. Amnesty International issued an Urgent Action Appeal (UA 222/96) on 20th September for her.

According to pro-rebel Tamilnet, forty five days later, the bodies of the four were later found in shallow graves within the army base. A three quarter width rope was found tied round the neck of Rassammah’s corpse. Kirupakaran too appeared to have been strangled in the same manner since the rope was wound tightly round his body. The bodies of Krishanti and her brother Pranavan were cut in several pieces and haphazardly wrapped in black colored sheets.

Later investigations revealed that she was abducted by five soldiers and another six gang raped and killed her at the checkpoint.

Government investigation
Amnesty International and other human rights organizations like Women for Peace launched a sustained campaign to pressure the Sri Lankan government to arrest and prosecute the soldiers. Six soldiers who were directly involved in the raping were sentenced to death by the court of the government of Sri Lanka.

In the court case about her rape and murder one of the accused informed the state about an alleged mass grave known as Chemmani mass graves that was investigated to contain 15 bodies.

Related to incident
According to pro-rebel Tamilnet, a local activist who worked to expose her case was killed by unknown gunmen on February 1, 2007. Her death anniversary is remembered in Chemmani and Jaffna the widowed wife of her neighbor whom she had married just 6 months before his murder also attended the event .

See also
Sexual violence against Tamils in Sri Lanka
Arumaithurai Tharmaletchumi
Case of Wijikala Nanthan and Sivamani Sinnathamby Weerakon
Ida Carmelitta
Ilayathambi Tharsini
Mary Madeleine
Murugesapillai Koneswary
Premawathi Manamperi
Premini Thanuskodi
Sarathambal
Thambipillai Thanalakshmi

References

External links 
 The Rape and Murder of Teen Aged Krishanti Kumaraswamy by Soldiers
Focus on Sri Lanka
Violence Against Women and the Death Penalty: Appropriating the Feminist Agenda
Human Rights and Sacred Cows

1977 births
1996 deaths
Gang rape in Sri Lanka
Human rights abuses in Sri Lanka
People murdered in Sri Lanka
Sri Lankan Hindus
Sri Lankan murder victims
Sri Lankan Tamil people
1996 murders in Sri Lanka